Majarshin (also Romanized as Majārshīn and Majāreshīn) is a village in Gonbar Rural District, in the Central District of Osku County, East Azerbaijan Province, Iran. At the 2011 census, its population was 1,112, in 304 families.

Majarshin is one of the villages of East Azerbaijan province which is located in Gonbar Rural District, in the Central District of Osku County and is located nearly 65 from the city of Tabriz, Majarshyn.

Majarshin is the ancient and historical village that has a green positive nature and is mountainous.

The Majarshin is considered as a treasure of monuments, landscapes and tourist attractions. The village currently has a population of approximately 1300 people.

Majarshin was originally Mirza neshin ( a place where  the people of high rank of society mostly lived) and in Reza Shah Pahlavi's time of policy of cultural assimilation which changing the name of cities was part of it, the name of village was changed. But, the residents of this village and surrounding villages apply the name of the village with its old dialect "Mirzeh Neshin" or (mirza neshin) the main activities of village's residents are in the areas of agriculture, horticulture, animal husbandry and carpet. The main source of income for the village Majarshin, is selling agricultural products such as nuts, raw rose and pussy. The milk production of heavy and light traps is another source of income that all these happen in the spring and summer. In winter, carpet weaving and selling it, is the most important source of income for village residents. It's interesting to know that potatoes are the symbol of Majarshin.

In Majarshin often walnut and willow Tabrizi are to be seen. Livestock in the village due to the high meadows and postures, especially Suyukh Boulagh and Agh valley in comparison with surrounding villages is wider done. Income resulting from the sale of surplus dairy products and consequently contribute to the economy of rural households.

Majarshin is a mountainous village with beautiful staircase home. An asphalt road connects the village with the town Osku and Azarshahr. Majarshin village location is so that makes it a top rating to the surrounding villages. This village is the confluence of two roads, Azarshahr to Gonbar and Osku to Gonbar.

The highest point of village is the Orian Mountain; the peak has a height of 2,850 m.

Majarshin village is located in the foothills of Yeke Soura Majarshin village.

History

Although the history of this village is not known, from the archaeological remains concerned to the historical periods of Islam, it can be discovered that the village is too old.

Historic cemetery of Majarshin:
Majarshin historic cemetery is one of the most interesting and historic areas, in which tombstones with inscriptions in Arabic, shows the popularity of Arabic writing long time ago in this village. The antiquity of this cemetery is related to the historical periods after Islam.

Bashlar: The historic rock houses in Majarshin are called Bushlar. These beautiful houses are stripped in the mountains with ledges which suggest life in this place a long time ago.

Rock Mosque of Majarshin: this mosque is related to the medieval and late periods of the history of Islam. That on 25 February 2007 with registered number 17506 was recorded as one of the Iranian national monuments.

References 

Populated places in Osku County